Compsomantis mindoroensis is a species of praying mantis that lives in the Philippines.

See also
List of mantis genera and species

References

Compsomantis
Insects of Asia
Insects described in 1942